Ruidoso News is a biweekly newspaper in Ruidoso, New Mexico, United States. It has been published since the 1940s.

References

External links
Official website

Newspapers published in New Mexico